Building at 1210–1214 Main Street, also known as Capitol Café, is a historic commercial building located at Columbia, South Carolina. It was built by 1871, and is a two-story, seven bay, stuccoed brick building.  A cast-iron railing extends across central three bays of the second floor. The Capitol Café was previously located in the building since 1913.

It was added to the National Register of Historic Places in 1979.

References

Commercial buildings on the National Register of Historic Places in South Carolina
Buildings and structures completed in 1871
Buildings and structures in Columbia, South Carolina
National Register of Historic Places in Columbia, South Carolina